Lyser or Liserus was an old and one-eyed rover mentioned in Gesta Danorum. He and Hading fought against Loker, the king of Curonians, only to be defeated.

The text

References

Legendary Norsemen